Smaïl Khaled (born ) is an Algerian football player. He has played for Algeria national team.

National team statistics

References

1975 births
Living people
Algerian footballers
Association football defenders
Algeria international footballers
21st-century Algerian people